Sophie Elisabeth of Brandenburg (1 February 1616 at Moritzburg Castle in Halle – 16 March 1650 at Altenburg Castle) was a Princess of Brandenburg by birth and by marriage Duchess of Saxe-Altenburg.

Life 
Sophie Elizabeth was the only child of Margrave Christian William of Brandenburg (1587-1665) from his first marriage with Dorothea (1596-1643), the daughter of the Duke Henry Julius of Brunswick-Wolfenbüttel.  The princess was born at Moritzburg Castle in Halle, where her father resided as administrator of the Archbishopric of Magdeburg.

She married on 18 September 1638 in Altenburg to Duke Frederick William II of Saxe-Altenburg (1603-1669). The marriage was described as a happy one; however, it remained childless.  She financially supported the construction of the Friedhof Church in Altenburg.

Sophie Elisabeth died 16 March 1650 and was buried in the ducal crypt in the Brother Church in Altenburg.

References 
 F. A. W. Dünnemann: Stammbuch der brandenburgisch-preussischen Regenten,  Nauck, 1831, p. 107
 Johann Sebastian Mitternacht: Trauer- und Trost-Ode : welche bey dem Fürstlichen Leichbegängnis der ... Sophien Elisabeten / Hertzogin zu Sachsen / Jülich / Cleve und Bergk ... des ... Friederich Wilhelmen / Hertzogen zu Sachsen ... Fürstlichen Gemahlin / höchstseligsten Andenckens ..., Fürstl. Sächß. Officin, Altenburg, 1650 (Online)

Footnotes 

German duchesses
German princesses
Sophie Elisabeth
1616 births
1650 deaths
17th-century German people
Sophie Elisabeth